Andrew Wilson (born 7 September 1974) is an Australian businessman who has been the CEO of Electronic Arts (EA) since September 2013.

Career
Wilson joined EA in 2000 and worked in the company's Asian and European markets for several years before moving to EA Sports and then becoming an Executive Producer on the FIFA franchise. In August 2011 he was appointed Executive Vice President of EA Sports, and he also took on duties as Executive Vice President of the company's Origin platform in April 2013.

Six months after the resignation of John Riccitiello, Wilson was chosen to be the new CEO of the company on 17 September 2013. In a blog post on EA's website, Wilson said that he was 'deeply honoured and humbled' to take up the job and said he envisioned EA as 'the world's greatest games company'. In recent years, he has been under fire for promoting microtransactions in EA's video games.

He is a former member of Intel's board of directors.

Personal life
Wilson was born in Geelong, Australia. He is married, and has one daughter and one son. He holds a brown belt in Brazilian Jiu Jitsu.

He lives in Atherton, California, the most expensive ZIP code in the United States. In 2022, he opposed a plan to loosen the zoning code of the affluent town (which only allows one house per acre) and permit multifamily housing.

Awards and accolades
 2015 — #3 on Fortune magazine's Business Person of the Year list, behind Nike CEO Mark Parker and Facebook CEO Mark Zuckerberg
 2015 — #3 on Forbes list of America's Most Powerful CEOs 40 and Under, behind Facebook CEO Mark Zuckerberg and Yahoo! CEO Marissa Mayer
 2015 — #58 on Adweeks Power List: The 100 Most Influential Leaders in Marketing and Tech
 2014 — #5 on BBC.com's list of best CEOs of 2014
 2014 — #6 on Forbes list of America's Most Powerful CEOs 40 and Under
 Winner — Motley Fool's The Best Tech CEOs of 2014
 2010 — Winner, BAFTA, Games/Sports — FIFA 2010
 2010 — Winner, BAFTA, Games/Use of Online — FIFA 2010

References

1974 births
Living people
People from Geelong
Businesspeople from Victoria (Australia)
Australian chief executives
Electronic Arts employees
Intel people
21st-century Australian businesspeople
Video game businesspeople
Harvard University alumni